WWIP is a Contemporary Christian and Religious formatted broadcast radio station licensed to Cheriton, Virginia, serving the Cape Charles/Norfolk/Hampton area.  WWIP is owned and operated by Delmarva Educational Association.

References

External links
 WWIP FM 89.1 Online
 

Contemporary Christian radio stations in the United States
Radio stations established in 2007
WIP
2007 establishments in West Virginia
Northampton County, Virginia